Xanthorhoe occulta is a species of moth in the family Geometridae. It is endemic to New Zealand and was first described by Alfred Philpott in 1903. It is found in the North, South and Stewart Islands. The adult moths are on the wing from

Taxonomy 
This species was first described by Alfred Philpott in 1903 using male specimens collected at West Plains, Invercargill. The male holotype has been lost but the two male paratype specimens are held in the New Zealand Arthropod Collection.

Description 

Philpott described the male adult of this species as follows:

The female of this species have wings that are reduced in size.

Distribution and habitat 
This species has been observed in the North, South and Stewart Islands, including in the Tararua Range, at Mount Arthur, Arthur's Pass, Otira, Dunedin and Invercargill in the South Island. In the North Island and the northern parts of the South Island this species appears to inhabit sub-alpine forest glades. However further south in the southern parts of the South Island and on Stewart Island this species can be found in lowland habitat.

Behaviour 
The adults of this species are on the wing from October to February. The adult moths are attracted to light.

Host plant 
Larvae of this species have been observed feeding on herbs.

References 

Xanthorhoe
Moths of New Zealand
Endemic fauna of New Zealand
Moths described in 1903
Taxa named by Alfred Philpott
Endemic moths of New Zealand